Alli Mia Fora may refer to:

 Alli Mia Fora (Antique album), 2003
 Alli Mia Fora (Marinella album), 1976
 Alli Mia Fora (Popi Maliotaki album), 2006